Camil Mmaee A Nwameben (born 21 February 2004) is a professional footballer who plays as a forward for Serie A club Bologna. Born in Belgium, he is a youth international for Morocco.

Club career
A youth product of Standard Liège since 2013, Mmaee signed his first professional contract with the club on 14 August 2021. He made his senior and professional debut with Standard Liège as a late substitute in a 1–0 Belgian First Division A win over Beerschot on 22 March 2022. On 29 July 2022, he transferred to the Italian club Bologna on a 3+1 year contract, where he was initially assigned to their reserves.

International career
Mmaee was first called up to play for the Morocco U17s in 2020. He was called up to the Morocco U20s for a set of friendlies in March 2022. He made one appearance for the U20s against the Romania U20s in a 2–2 friendly tie on 29 March 2022.

Personal life
Mmaee was born in Belgium to a Cameroonian father and Moroccan mother. His siblings Ryan, Samy, and Jack are also footballers.

References

External links
 

2004 births
Living people
Moroccan footballers
Morocco youth international footballers
Belgian footballers
Moroccan people of Cameroonian descent
Belgian people of Moroccan descent
Belgian people of Cameroonian descent
Association football forwards
Standard Liège players
Bologna F.C. 1909 players
Belgian Pro League players
Moroccan expatriate footballers
Moroccan expatriates in Italy
Belgian expatriate footballers
Belgian expatriates in Italy
Expatriate footballers in Italy